Kvitka may refer to:

Ivan Kvitka (born 1967), Russian politician
Kvitka Cisyk (1953–1998), American coloratura soprano of Ukrainian ethnicity
Hryhory Kvitka (1778–1843) Ukrainian writer, journalist, and playwright
Kliment Kvitka (1880–1953), Ukrainian musicologist and ethnographer
Larysa Petrivna Kosach-Kvitka (1871–1913), married name of Ukrainian poet Lesya Ukrainka